Karysun / Year of No Light is a split EP between the French heavy metal bands Karysun and Year of No Light.

Track listing 
Side A: Karysun
 "Salvation" – 4:33

Side B: Year of No Light
 "Adoration" – 4:13

Personnel
Karysun

Band members
 Nicolas Bazire – drums, backing vocals
 Marc Euvrie – guitars, electronics, vocals

Production
 Anthony Josse – recording
 Guillaume Doussaud – engineering, mixing and mastering

Year of No Light

Band members
 Bertrand Sébenne – drums
 Jérôme Alban – guitar
 Pierre Anouilh – guitar
 Julien Perez – vocals, keyboards
 Johan Sébenne – bass

Production
 Cyrille Gachet – engineering, mixing and mastering

Other personnel
 Ryan Patterson – album art and design

References

2009 EPs
Split EPs
Karysun albums
Year of No Light albums